A grotto is a natural or artificial cave.

Grotto may also refer to:

Organizations
 Grotto (National Speleological Society), an internal organization
 Grotto (Satanism), a clandestine association or gathering
 Mystic Order of Veiled Prophets of the Enchanted Realm (The Grotto), an appendant body in Freemasonry

Places
 Grotto, Washington, an unincorporated US community
 Grotto of the Redemption, a religious shrine in Iowa, US
 The Grotto (Portland, Oregon), a US Catholic sanctuary
 The Grotto, a feature of the Playboy Mansion
 The Grotto (San Antonio), Texas, US
 The Grotto, Victoria, a geological formation in Australia
 The Grotto, a natural cavern in Bruce Peninsula National Park, Ontario, Canada
 Grotten, a state-owned honorary residence in Oslo, Norway

Other uses
 Grotto (comics), a Marvel comics character
 The Grotto (album), 2003, by Kristin Hersh

See also
 Blue Grotto (disambiguation)
 Christmas grotto, an annual Santa Claus-themed staging in retail centers
 Santa's Grotto, a similar concept themed to Santa's workshop
 Grotta-Pelos culture, a phase of Cycladic civilization